Kobersdorf is an Austrian market town in Oberpullendorf, Burgenland.

Geography
Kobersdorf is located in Middle Burgenland and is divided into the districts of Kobersdorf, Lindgraben, and Oberpetersdorf. The municipality lies at the foot of the Pauliberg, the last extinct volcano in Austria in the middle of the Naturpark Landseer Berge.

History
Like the rest of Burgenland, Kobersdorf belonged to the Kingdom of Hungary until 1920–21. After the end of the First World War, the western border area of Hungary was awarded to Austria by the Treaties of St. Germain and Trianon. Since 1921, the town has belonged to the newly founded State of Burgenland.

Kobersdorf was one of the Jewish Siebengemeinden of Burgenland. Its synagogue, built in 1860, is the only one in the seven communities that still stands. Since its restoration, it has been used for memorial services.

Kobersdorf has been a market town since 1973 (through a recently reissued VO 5).

Politics
Kobersdorf's mayor is Klaus Schütz of the SPÖ. Vice-Mayor Johann Binder is a member of the ÖVP. The Chief Officer is Hans Helmut Tremmel.

The mandate assignments in the Municipal Council (21 seats) are SPÖ 11, ÖVP 7, FPÖ 0, Grüne 0, and other lists 3.

Culture and landmarks
Kobersdorf Palace ( Schloss Kobersdorf) is famous for the plays that take place there every July. Since 2004, they have been led by Wolfgang Böck, and before that the director was Rudolf Buczolich. In the 2006 season, the production was The Threepenny Opera. Wolfgang Böck played the role of Mackie Messer.

Business and Infrastructure
The most important employers are:
 the mineral water producer Waldquelle
 the Basalt Quarry on the Pauliberg
 the Hobby Versand Company
 the Reitter Bau Company

Notable residents 
 Yosef Chaim Zonnenfeld

Sister cities
  Waldbrun in Baden-Württemberg, Germany

References

 The information in this article is based on a translation of its German equivalent.

Cities and towns in Oberpullendorf District
Siebengemeinden